Events from the year 1973 in Michigan.

The Associated Press (AP) selected the top news stories for 1973 in Michigan as follows:

 The selection of Michigan Congressman Gerald Ford as Vice President of the United States following the resignation of Spiro Agnew;
 The 1973 oil crisis;
 Layoffs in the automobile industry following a drop in sales;
 Negotiations between the United Auto Workers and the Big Three automobile manufacturers;
 Coleman Young's election victory on November 6 over former police commissioner John F. Nichols to become the first African-American Mayor of Detroit;
 (tie) The Michigan State Lottery earned $61 million in its first full year;
 (tie) Natural gas forced residents to evacuate their homes in Williamsburg, Michigan;
 Severe winter storms struck the state in March;
 Union construction workers protested at nonunion work sites in Kalkaska and Midland; and
 Col. William Nolde of Michigan was the last American soldier to die in combat in the Vietnam War; he was killed on January 27 when artillery blew up his bunker 11 hours before the ceasefire.

The AP also chose the state's top sports stories as follows:
 The 1973 Michigan Wolverines football team's being passed over for the 1974 Rose Bowl despite its undefeated season and playing Ohio State to a 10–10 tie on November 24;
 John Hiller's comeback from a heart attack to set a major league record with 34 saves;
 Gordie Howe signing a contract on June 19 to play with his sons for the Houston Aeros of the World Hockey Association;
 The Saginaw Arthur Hill High School football team compiling an undefeated season and outscoring opponents, 443–0;
 The September 2 firing of Billy Martin as manager of the Detroit Tigers;
 Joe Schmidt's January 12 resignation as head coach of the Detroit Lions;
 The hiring of Alex Delvecchio as general manager of the Detroit Red Wings and the firing of Ted Garvin as coach;
 The rise of girls' athletics in the state, including Carolyn King playing for a boys' Little League team in Ypsilanti;
 The October 11 hiring of Ralph Houk as the new manager of the Detroit Tigers; and
 The firing of Johnny Wilson as head coach of the Detroit Red Wings and the naming of Ted Garvin as coach.

Office holders

State office holders
 Governor of Michigan: William Milliken (Republican) 
 Lieutenant Governor of Michigan: James H. Brickley (Republican)
 Michigan Attorney General: Frank J. Kelley (Democrat)
 Michigan Secretary of State: Richard H. Austin (Democrat)
 Speaker of the Michigan House of Representatives: William A. Ryan (Democrat)
 Majority Leader of the Michigan Senate: Robert VanderLaan (Republican)
 Chief Justice, Michigan Supreme Court:

Mayors of major cities

 Mayor of Detroit: Roman Gribbs
 Mayor of Grand Rapids: Lyman S. Parks
 Mayor of Flint: Francis E. Limmer/Paul Calvin Visser
 Mayor of Lansing: Gerald W. Graves
 Mayor of Dearborn: Orville L. Hubbard
 Mayor of Ann Arbor: Robert J. Harris (Democrat) / James E. Stephenson (Republican)
 Mayor of Saginaw: Paul H. Wendler/William F. Nelson, Jr.

Federal office holders

 U.S. Senator from Michigan: Robert P. Griffin (Republican)
 U.S. Senator from Michigan: Philip Hart (Democrat) 
 House District 1: John Conyers (Democrat)
 House District 2: Marvin L. Esch (Republican)
 House District 3: Garry E. Brown (Republican)
 House District 4: J. Edward Hutchinson (Republican)
 House District 5: Gerald Ford (Republican)
 House District 6: Charles E. Chamberlain (Republican)
 House District 7: Donald W. Riegle Jr. (Republican)
 House District 8: R. James Harvey (Republican)
 House District 9: Guy Vander Jagt (Republican)
 House District 10: Elford Albin Cederberg (Republican)
 House District 11: Philip Ruppe (Republican)
 House District 12: James G. O'Hara (Democrat)
 House District 13: Charles Diggs (Democrat)
 House District 14: Lucien N. Nedzi (Democrat)
 House District 15: William D. Ford (Democrat)
 House District 16: John Dingell Jr. (Democrat)
 House District 17: Martha Griffiths (Democrat)
 House District 18: William Broomfield (Republican)
 House District 19: Jack H. McDonald (Republican)

Population

Sports

Baseball
 1973 Detroit Tigers season – Under managers Billy Martin and Joe Schultz, the Tigers compiled an 85–77 record and finished third in the American League East. The team's statistical leaders included Willie Horton with a .316 batting average, Norm Cash with 19 home runs, Aurelio Rodriguez with 58 RBIs, Joe Coleman with 23 wins, and John Hiller with a 1.44 earned run average.

American football
 1973 Detroit Lions season – The Lions, under head coach Don McCafferty, compiled a 6–7–1 record and finished in second place in the NFL's Central Division. The team's statistical leaders included Bill Munson with 1,129 passing yards, Altie Taylor with 719 rushing yards, Charlie Sanders with 433 receiving yards, and Errol Mann with 53 points scored.
 1973 Michigan Wolverines football team – Under head coach Bo Schembechler, the Wolverines compiled a 10–0–1 record, tying with Ohio State in the final game of the season. The Wolverines were ranked No. 6 in the final AP Poll. The team's statistical leaders included Dennis Franklin with 534 passing yards, Ed Shuttlesworth with 745 rushing yards and 78 points scored, and Paul Seal with 254 receiving yards.

Basketball
 1972–73 Detroit Pistons season – Under head coaches Earl Lloyd and Ray Scott, the Pistons compiled a 40–42 record and finished third in the NBA's Midwest Division. The team's statistical leaders included Bob Lanier with 1,927 points and 1,205 rebounds and Dave Bing with 637 assists.
 1972–73 Michigan Wolverines men's basketball team – Under head coach Johnny Orr, the Wolverines compiled a 13–11 record and finished sixth in the Big Ten Conference. The team's statistical leaders included Henry Wilmore with 523 points and Campy Russell with 231 rebounds.

Ice hockey
 1972–73 Detroit Red Wings season – Under head coach Johnny Wilson, the Red Wings compiled a 37–29–10 record and finished fifth in the National Hockey League's East Division. The team's statistical leaders included Mickey Redmond with 52 goals and 93 points scored and Alex Delvecchio with 53 assists. The team's regular goaltenders were Roy Edwards and Denis DeJordy.

Golf
 Buick Open – 
 Michigan Open –

Boat racing
 Port Huron to Mackinac Boat Race – 
 Spirit of Detroit race –
 APBA Gold Cup –

Other
 1972 NCAA Indoor Track and Field Championships – 
 Yankee 600 -

Music
Albums and singles by Michigan artists or centered on Michigan topics that were released or became hits in 1973 include the following:
 Detroit native Diana Ross had a big year.  Her single, "Touch Me in the Morning", released in May 1973, reached No. 1 on the Billboard Hot 100 and was ranked No. 10 on the Billboard Year-End Hot 100 singles of 1973. The album Touch Me in the Morning was released in June and reached No. 5 on the Billboard album chart. Ross had two other album releases in 1973. Diana & Marvin, a duet album with Marvin Gaye, was released in October and reached No. 26 on the album chart. It included the single "You're a Special Part of Me" that reached No. 12 on the Hot 100. A third album from Ross, Last Time I Saw Him, was released in December 1973.
 Stevie Wonder, who was born in Saginaw and raised in Detroit, scored three of the year's biggest hits. "You Are the Sunshine of My Life, released in April 1973, reached No. 1 on the Billboard Hot 100, and was ranked No. 19 on the Billboard Year-End Hot 100 singles of 1973. "Superstition", released in October 1972, also reached No. 1 on the Hot 100, and was ranked No. 19 on the 1973 year-end singles list. "Higher Ground", released in July 1973, reached No. 4 on the Hot 100, and was ranked No. 62 on year-end singles list.
 Flint's Grand Funk Railroad had a breakout year. The album We're an American Band was released in July 1973 and reached No. 2 on the Billboard album chart.  The single "We're an American Band" reached No. 1 on the Hot 100 and was ranked No. 23 on the Billboard Year-End Hot 100 singles of 1973.
 The Spinners, from Ferndale, Michigan, also had a big year.  Their single, "Could It Be I'm Falling in Love" was released in December 1972, reached No. 1 on the Hot 100, and was ranked No. 47 on the Billboard's 1973 year-end singles list. The follow-up album, Spinners, was released in April 1973 and reached No. 1 on the R&B album chart.  The single "One of a Kind (Love Affair)" reached No. 11 on the Billboard Hot 100 and was ranked No. 82 on the 1973 year-end singles list.
 The Temptations released two albums in 1973: Masterpiece in February 1973 (No. 7 on the Billboard album chart); and 1990 in December 1973 (No. 19 on the album chart). The Temptations also had two hit singles: "Masterpiece", released in February 1973, reached No. 7 on the Hot 100, and was ranked No. 80 on the Billboard year-end list for 1973. "Papa Was a Rollin' Stone", released in September 1972, reached No. 1 on the Hot 100, and was ranked No. 100 on the 1973 year-end list.
 "Ain't No Woman (Like the One I've Got)", a single from The Four Tops, was released in January 1973, reached No. 4 on the Billboard Hot 100, and was ranked No. 60 on the Billboard Year-End Hot 100 singles of 1973.
 "Panic in Detroit" by David Bowie was released in April 1973.
 Raw Power, an album by Ann Arbor's The Stooges, was released in February 1973. It included the song "Search and Destroy".
 Hey Now Hey (The Other Side of the Sky), an album from Aretha Franklin, was released in June 1973. The album included two songs that went to No. 1 on the R&B chart: "Angel" and "Until You Come Back to Me (That's What I'm Gonna Do)".
 Back in '72, an album from Bob Seger, was released in January 1973. It included the song "Turn the Page".

Chronology of events

January

February

March

April

May

June

July

August

September

October

November

December

Births
 January 20 - Jalen Rose, basketball player, in Detroit
 February 21 - Brian Rolston, hockey player, in Flint, Michigan
 March 1 - Chris Webber, basketball player, in Detroit
 October 2 - Proof, rapper, in Detroit
 Date unknown - Betsy Brandt, actress (Breaking Bad, Life in Pieces), in Bay City, Michigan

Gallery of 1973 births

Deaths
 March 26 - George Sisler, baseball player at the University of Michigan (1913-1915) and Major League Baseball (1915-1930) and Baseball Hall of Fame inductee, at age 80 in Richmond Heights, Missouri
 August 17 - Paul Williams, baritone singer and choreographer and original member of The Temptations, of suicide at age 34 in Detroit
 December 19 - Prentiss M. Brown, U.S. Congressman (1933-1936) and Senator (1936-1943), at age 84 in St. Ignace, Michigan

Gallery of 1973 deaths

See also
 History of Michigan
 History of Detroit

References